Hohenbergia minor is a plant species in the genus Hohenbergia. This species is endemic to Brazil.

References

minor
Flora of Brazil